The Millpond Years is the third studio album by English band And Also the Trees.

Background 

The Millpond Years was recorded in February 1988 at The Abattoir in Birmingham, England.

Track listing

Personnel 

 Simon Huw Jones – vocals, other instruments
 Justin Jones – guitar, other instruments
 Steven Burrows – bass guitar, other instruments
 Nick Havas – drums, other instruments
 Mark Tibenham - additional keyboards, other instruments

References

External links 

 

1988 albums
And Also the Trees albums